Coded Hostile is a 1989 British television film directed by David Darlow and written by Brian Phelan, about the real life shoot-down of Korean Air Flight 007. The film stars Michael Murphy, Michael Moriarty, Chris Sarandon, Harris Yulin, Otto Jarman and Bradley Lavelle. It was produced by Granada Television, and first screened on ITV on 7 September 1989. A revised version was screened by Channel 4 on 31 August 1993 to include details of subsequent events.

Plot

Cast 

MISAWA LISTENING POST:
Ed O'Ross as Sgt. Duffy
Gavan O'Herlihy as Sgt. Muller
George Roth as Capt. Ames
Mark Burton as Levin
Otto Jarman as Clark
Bradley Lavelle as Jamie
Kieron Jecchinis as Coles
Matthew Freeman as Aaron
Andrea Browne and James Tillitt as Operatives

STATE DEPARTMENT:
Michael Murphy as Richard Burt
Debora Weston as Carol
Colin Bruce as Dave
Marc Smith as Mort
Bill Bailey as Military
Peter Whitman and Francine Body as Watch Officers
Alexander Webb as Aide

PENTAGON:
Michael Moriarty as Maj. Hank Daniels
Harris Yulin as Gen. Tyson
Jay Patterson as Gene
Shane Rimmer as Adm. Riley
Nic D'Avirro as Norman
Weston Gavin as Vince
Stephen Hoye as Capt. Beales
Eugene Brell and Colin Stinson as Operators
Thomasine Heiner as Mrs. Tyson

NATIONAL SECURITY COUNCIL:
Chris Sarandon as John Lenczowski
Rolf Saxon as Frank
Lee Calder as Secretary
Angus MacInnes as Marilees
William Roberts as Villiger
Vincent Marzello as Military Rep
Brian Greene as Staff Member
Cliff Taylor as Typist

COBRA BALL:
Keith Edwards as Officer
Robert Jezek as Co-Pilot

TV NEWS:
Garrick Hagon as Anchorman
Jana Shelden as Jane Leonart

LAWYERS:
Michael Shannon as Grover
Joris Stuyck as Sherman

SOVIET AIR DEFENCES:
Tomasz Borkowy as Maj. Kasmin 
Boris Isarov as Commander
Alexei Jawdokimov as Aide
Stéphane Cornicard as Radar operator

KOREAN AIRLINES:
Togo Igawa as Capt. Chun
Takeshi Kawahara as Co-Pilot Flight 007
Soon-Tek Oh as Capt. Park
Eddie Yeo as Co-Pilot Flight 015

International Broadcasts
The film was first shown by HBO in the United States as Tailspin: Behind the Korean Airliner Tragedy on 20 August 1989.

See also
Shootdown

References

External links
 

1989 television films
British thriller television films
1989 thriller films
Films set in 1983
1980s English-language films